Carl Alexander von Martius (born January 19, 1838, in Munich; died February 26, 1920, in Nonn by Bad Reichenhall) was a German chemist and entrepreneur.

Life 
His father was botanist and explorer Carl Friedrich Philipp von Martius (1794–1868) and his mother was author Franziska von Stengel (1801–1843). In 1872, Martius married Margarete Veit (1853–1926). On February 16, 1903, Martius became by German king Wilhelm II a nobleman.

Martius studied chemistry. At university he was member of student organisation Corps Bremensia. He was a student of Justus von Liebig and university assistent August Wilhelm von Hofmann in Berlin.

In 1863, Martius invented in Berlin azo dye Bismarck brown Y, which he named after german chancellor Otto von Bismarck.  It is used in histology for staining tissues.
In 1867, Martius invented in Berlin Dinitronaphthol, which was later named after him as Martiusgelb. In Berlin, together with German chemist Paul Mendelssohn Bartholdy he founded in 1867 German company Aktiengesellschaft für Anilinfabrikation (Agfa).
Martius was founding member of German organisation Deutsche Chemische Gesellschaft in Berlin and of German organisation Vereins zur Wahrung der Interessen der chemischen Industrie Deutschlands. In 1891, Martius was foundig member of German organisation German Association for the Protection of Intellectual Property in Berlin. From 1916 to 1918 Martius was member of Prussian House of Lords.

Literature over Martius 
  
 Gothaisches Genealogisches Taschenbuch der Adeligen Häuser, Teil B 1941, page 356, Verlag Justus Perthes, Gotha 1941.
 Norbert Welsch und Claus Chr. Liebmann, Farben – Natur, Technik, Kunst, Spektrum Akademischer Verlag, Heidelberg/Berlin 2003, page 204.
 Acta Borussica Band 10 (1909–1918) (PDF-Datei; 2,74 MB)

See also 
 Hofmann–Martius rearrangement

External links  
 
 Literatur list in Online-cataloge by Staatsbibliothek zu Berlin

References 

19th-century German businesspeople
20th-century German businesspeople
German chemical industry people
19th-century German chemists
German industrialists
German company founders
Members of the Prussian House of Lords
Scientists from Munich
Businesspeople from Munich
1838 births
1920 deaths
Agfa